Air North Charter and Training Ltd., operating as , is a Canadian airline based in Whitehorse, Yukon. It operates scheduled passenger and cargo flights throughout Yukon, as well as between Yukon and the Northwest Territories, British Columbia, Alberta, and Ontario. The airline also operates charter flights throughout Canada and Alaska. The airline also provides ground handling services and fuel services to other airlines throughout Yukon, and it also provides ground handling services at Vancouver International Airport and Edmonton International Airport. Its main base is Erik Nielsen Whitehorse International Airport.

History 

The airline was established by Joe Sparling and Tom Woods, and started flight training and general purpose charter operations in 1977 with a single Cessna 206. Throughout the 1980s the company steadily grew and acquired several more aircraft including Douglas DC-3s, a Douglas DC-4, and a variety of Cessnas, de Havillands and other aircraft. Also during the 1980s Air North began offering scheduled passenger and cargo service in addition to charter services. During the 1990s the fleet of piston-powered aircraft were replaced with more modern and reliable turboprop aircraft, and by 2000 the fleet consisted of one Beechcraft Model 99 and three Hawker Siddeley 748 Series 2As.

The Vuntut Gwitchin First Nation of Old Crow also began investing in Air North around this time, and with help from this investment Air North acquired a pair of Boeing 737-200 jets in 2002. These jets allowed Air North to begin competing with the mainline carriers between Yukon and Vancouver, Calgary and Edmonton. These routes proved to be successful and since then Kelowna, Yellowknife, Ottawa , Toronto, and Victoria have also been added to Air North's route map. Since Air North began scheduled jet service on Yukon-South routes passenger traffic at the Erik Nielsen Whitehorse International Airport has doubled, and by 2014 nearly 60% of those passengers were flying with Air North.

The Beech 99 was sold in 2005, a fourth Hawker Siddeley 748 acquired in 2006, and in 2008 a Boeing 737-200 combi was acquired, with its large main deck cargo door and moveable bulkhead allowing all-cargo as well as mixed cargo/passenger operations with the 737. Soon a gravel kit was also installed on the 737 Combi, allowing the aircraft to operate on the airline's northern routes.

Starting in 2010 a new fleet expansion and modernization plan was put into action, beginning with a larger B737-400 and a winglet-equipped B737-500. In 2012 a fifth HS748 (a pure freighter equipped with the large freight door) and a second 737-500 were acquired. 2014 saw the arrival of the third 737-500 sporting an updated livery, and a fourth 737-500 was put into service in 2016. In spring of 2017 two ATR 42 combi aircraft were introduced to the fleet and put to work on the northern routes, bringing an end to the world's last scheduled passenger HS-748 service. Two HS-748s remained in service through 2020 for freight and charters, however these have also now been replaced with additional ATR-42s. 

With the newer aircraft in service the three 737-200s and five HS-748s were eventually either retired or sold. Some are now parked behind Air North's maintenance base and used for spare parts and staff training.

Since the arrival of the Boeing 737s, the main Air North base in Whitehorse has steadily expanded. It now includes the original hangar which is now used as a cargo warehouse and ground equipment shop, a new aircraft maintenance hangar (the largest north of 60 in Canada) a reservations and administration building, an operations centre, an in-house catering and cabin services department, and a fueling facility. Air North also operates secondary bases in Vancouver, B.C. and Dawson City, Yukon.

In conjunction with North of Ordinary Media, Air North launched its inflight magazine, Yukon, North of Ordinary in February 2007. Yukon, North of Ordinary is published quarterly with a press run of 20,000. It is available in-flight, via subscriptions, and in bookstores across Canada. The magazine is owned and operated by North of Ordinary Media of Carcross, Yukon.

Also in the mid-2000s Air North opened its own flight kitchen in Whitehorse. On most flights Air North offers a complimentary light meal made fresh daily, followed by a complimentary dessert such as cheesecake or fresh cookies. Yukon products are featured when possible, and often include Midnight Sun coffee and Yukon Brewing beer. Over the years Air North has won several awards for its outstanding customer service, and was recently named "the 2nd most loved airline in the world" by Fortune magazine.

Currently the mainstay of Air North's work is scheduled passenger and cargo flights between Whitehorse and Vancouver, Kelowna, Victoria, Calgary, Edmonton, Yellowknife, Ottawa, Toronto, Dawson City, Old Crow, Mayo and Inuvik. Air North also runs regular freight trips and fuel-haul flights to the fly-in only community of Old Crow, Yukon. In addition to scheduled routes, Air North is also involved in a variety of charter work and they offer passenger, combi, cargo and fuel-haul charter services to anywhere in North America with the ATR 42s and Boeing 737s. Regular charter customers include mine operators, cruise ship tour operators, fishing lodges, sports teams, and others. The remainder of Air North's revenue comes from ground handling services at Whitehorse, Dawson City, Old Crow, Edmonton and Vancouver Airports, as well as Jet-A refuelling services at Whitehorse. Air North is currently the main provider of Jet-A fuel service in Whitehorse. It is also the ground handler for Condor Airlines and WestJet Airlines in Whitehorse, as well as several airlines in Vancouver.

Air North is now owned by Joseph Sparling (51%) (President, CEO, and Boeing 737 Captain) and the Vuntut Development Corporation (49%), an arm of the Vuntut Gwitchin First Nation. Air North is one of the largest private sector employers in Yukon. As of 2015 it has over 500 employees and more than 1,200 Class C & D shareholders.

Destinations

Scheduled flights

As of February 2021, Air North provides scheduled service to the following destinations.

Charter flights

In addition to scheduled flights, Air North offers passenger, freight and combi charter services throughout Yukon and across North America. Both the ATR-42s and 737s are regularly chartered for mining, forestry, sports teams, fishing lodges, cruise tours, and a variety of other customers.

Air North provides seasonal vacation charter flights to Harry Reid Airport in Las Vegas, Reno-Tahoe International Airport in Reno, and Victoria International Airport in Victoria.

Air North also provides seasonal fishing charters from Vancouver International Airport to Denny Island Aerodrome in Bella Bella, British Columbia; and Masset Airport in Masset.

Air North provides seasonal cruise ship charters from Dawson City Airport to Fairbanks International Airport in Fairbanks.

During the 2021 Canadian federal election, NDP leader Jagmeet Singh's campaign chartered an Air North Boeing 737-500.

Fleet

Current fleet 
As of February 2022, the Air North fleet consists of the following aircraft:

Historic fleet 
Aircraft previously operated include:

Beechcraft Model 18
Beechcraft Model 99
Beechcraft Queen Air
Boeing 737-200
Britten-Norman BN-2 Islander
Cessna 150
Cessna 172
Cessna 185 Skywagon
Cessna 206
Cessna Skymaster
de Havilland Canada DHC-2 Beaver
de Havilland Canada DHC-3 Otter
de Havilland Canada DHC-4 Caribou
Douglas DC-3
Douglas DC-4
Fairchild F-11 Husky
Hawker Siddeley 748

Livery

Air North's aircraft are painted white except for the lettering on the fuselage, wings and vertical stabilizer, although different aircraft types feature slightly different liveries.

On the fuselage, the words "Air North" and "Yukon's Airline" are painted, although the positioning varies by aircraft type. On aircraft without winglets, "flyairnorth.com" is painted somewhere on the fuselage. On the Hawker Siddeley HS 748, the bottom is left unpainted with an orange stripe at the convergence of the painted and unpainted areas.

The tail is painted orange with a stylized "Yukon" printed in white. On the ATR 42-300 and 737-400/-500, the orange is extended below onto the fuselage.

On aircraft with winglets, the outside is designed like the tail, with an orange background and the stylized "Yukon" printed on it. On the inside, "flyairnorth.com" is printed.

Yukon, North of Ordinary
Yukon, North of Ordinary (YNoO) is a quarterly arts, travel, and culture magazine in Yukon, Canada. The magazine was first published in February 2007. It is also the official inflight magazine for Air North, Yukon's Airline.

Accidents and incidents
On 20 September 1987, Piper PA-31 Navajo C-GPAC crashed on a flight from Whitehorse to Juneau, Alaska, killing all five on board.
On 19 August 1995, Douglas C-47B C-GZOF crashed on approach to Vancouver International Airport, Richmond, British Columbia, killing one of the three crew. The aircraft was on a ferry flight to Prince Rupert Airport when the starboard propeller went into overspeed and the decision was made to return to Vancouver International.
On 14 August 1996, Douglas DC-4 C-FGNI crashed shortly after takeoff from Bronson Creek mine in Northern B.C. with three crew and a full load of cargo on board. On climbout No. 2 engine caught fire and eventually separated from the aircraft. The first officer and load master swam to shore, but the captain was never found and presumed to have drowned.

References

External links

Official website

Air Transport Association of Canada
Airlines established in 1977
Regional airlines of the Northwest Territories
Regional airlines of Yukon
Companies based in Whitehorse
1977 establishments in Yukon